Antía Jácome (born 22 November 1999) is a Spanish sprint canoeist. She is representing Spain at the 2020 Summer Olympics in Tokyo 2021, competing in women's C-1 200 metres.

References

External link

 

1999 births
Living people
Sportspeople from Pontevedra
Spanish female canoeists
Canoeists at the 2020 Summer Olympics
Olympic canoeists of Spain
ICF Canoe Sprint World Championships medalists in Canadian
21st-century Spanish women